Álvaro José Hodeg Chagüi (born 16 September 1996 in Monteria) is a Colombian cyclist, who currently rides for UCI WorldTeam . In October 2020, he was named in the startlist for the 2020 Giro d'Italia.

Major results

2017
 1st  Intermediate sprints classification Girobio
 1st Stage 6 Tour de l'Avenir
 2nd Grote Prijs Stad Sint-Niklaas
2018
 1st Handzame Classic
 1st Stage 1 Volta a Catalunya
 1st Stage 1 Deutschland Tour
 1st Stage 3 Tour de Pologne
 1st Stage 5 Tour of Turkey
 1st Stage 1 (TTT) Adriatica Ionica Race
 3rd Grand Prix de Fourmies
 4th Elfstedenronde
2019
 1st Münsterland Giro
 1st Heistse Pijl
 Adriatica Ionica Race
1st  Points classification
1st Stages 1 & 4
 1st Stage 2 Tour Colombia
 1st Stage 2 Tour of Norway
 1st Stage 5 BinckBank Tour
 3rd Bredene Koksijde Classic
2021 
 1st Grote Prijs Marcel Kint
 1st Stage 1 Tour de l'Ain
 1st Stage 1 Okolo Slovenska
 7th Grand Prix de Fourmies
 8th Münsterland Giro

Grand Tour general classification results timeline

References

External links

1996 births
Living people
Colombian male cyclists
People from Montería
21st-century Colombian people